Danionella mirifica is a species of cyprinid fish. It is endemic to northern Myanmar and only known from its type locality in Myitkyina District. It is a small species, growing to  standard length.

References

mirifica
Cyprinid fish of Asia
Fish of Myanmar
Endemic fauna of Myanmar
Fish described in 2003